The Lister Jaguar Monza, nicknamed the Monzanapolis, was an open-wheel race car, designed, developed and built by British manufacturer Lister Motor Company, and raced by Scottish team Ecurie Ecosse at the special Race of Two Worlds, in 1958.

References

Indianapolis 500
American Championship racing cars
Open wheel racing cars